UDF may refer to:

Astronomy
 Ultra Deep Field, a view of the distant universe taken in 2004 by the Hubble space telescope
 UDF 423, a distant spiral galaxy
 UDF 2457, a red dwarf star

Computing
 Universal Disk Format, an operating-system-independent file system commonly used on DVD and other digital media
 Uniqueness Database File, a Windows XP Professional configuration text file
 User-defined function, a function provided by the user of a program or environment

Organizations

Politics
 United Democratic Forces (ОДС), an electoral alliance in Bulgaria
 United Democratic Forces of Belarus, a coalition of political parties participating as the main opposition group during the 2006 presidential election
 United Democratic Front (Botswana)
 United Democratic Front (Kerala), India
 United Democratic Front (Mizoram), India
 United Democratic Front (Malawi)
 United Democratic Front (Namibia)
 United Democratic Front (Pakistan)
 United Democratic Front (South Africa)
 United Democratic Front (South Sudan)
 United Democratic Forum Party, a former political party in Kenya
 Union pour la Démocratie Française (Union for French Democracy), a former centrist pro-European French political party

Military
 Ulster Defence Force, a paramilitary group in Northern Ireland
 Union Defence Force (South Africa), the predecessor of the South African Defence Force from 1912 to 1957
 Union Defence Force (UAE), the armed forces of the United Arab Emirates

Other organizations
 United Dairy Farmers, an American chain of ice cream shops

Other uses
 Unducted fan, a type of jet engine
 United Defense Force, a fictional global military in the manga All You Need Is Kill and its film adaptation Edge of Tomorrow
 Ural Delay Factor, When your sidecar attracts attention from bystanders, thereby delaying your departure.

See also
 Union of Democratic Forces (disambiguation), several political parties